Mateo Sanz Lanz (born 6 November 1993) is a Spanish-born Swiss windsurfer. He competed for Switzerland at the 2016 Summer Olympics, placing 14th in the men's RS:X event, and at the 2020 Summer Olympics, placing 8th in the men's RS:X event. Sanz Lanz placed 2nd in the men's event at the 2017 RS:X World Championships. He was born in Formentera del Segura and resides in San Francisco Javier, Formentera, Balearic Islands.

References

External links
 
 

1993 births
Living people
Swiss windsurfers
Swiss male sailors (sport)
Olympic sailors of Switzerland
Sailors at the 2016 Summer Olympics – RS:X
Sailors at the 2020 Summer Olympics – RS:X
21st-century Swiss people